Saint-Cléophas is a Parish municipality in the regional county municipality of La Matapédia in Quebec (Canada), situated in the administrative region of Bas-Saint-Laurent.

Toponymy 
The name chosen for the parish during the municipal erection in 1921, highlights the work of Father Joseph Cleophas Saindon (1866-1941), a priest of the neighbouring parish of Saint-Nom-de-Marie-de-Sayabec from 1896 to 1941, serving the parish from 1918. It is also named in honour of Saint Cleophas.

Administrative Region 
The Parish Municipality of Saint-Cléophas is part of the La Matapédia Regional County Municipality in the Bas-Saint-Laurent. The parish of Saint-Céeophas is part of the Archdiocese of Rimouski.

Geographical Location 
Saint-Cléophas is located on a side of the mountain chain of the Appalachian specifically in the section of Mt Saint-Anne. The municipality is located 8 km south of the Highway 132 through Sayabec on Lacroix Road.

Economy 
The local economy is mainly based on forestry, sawmills, agriculture and cattle farms of both sheep and dairy. There are also many forests producing maple syrup. In addition, Panval plant in Sayabec provides many jobs.

History 
In the early 1900s, the pioneers of Sayabec created the foundations for StCléophas in a town known as Awantjish, which was described as having good soil and timber (especially birch, maple and cedar.) By 1908, a group of settlers living in the territory of what is today St-Cléophas made offerings to the Bishop of Rimouski, Monsignor André-Albert Blais, to found a parish in the area. The prelate had considered that it was a premature gesture due to the low population of the area (about 300 people). Finally the parish opened at the end of the First World War. The mission of St-Cléophas to gain both parish and municipality status became a reality, and in 1921 the town detached from the  Municipality of Sayabec.  However, the pastor of Sayabec, Father Cléophas Saindon, served as the first pastor at St Cleophas until the vicar of Sayabec, Father Charles Pelletier could become pastor of St-Cléophas. It is also in 1921 that the town began to officially use a calendar to mark milestones.

Important Events 
In 1944, the church chapel was burned.  That same year, Georges-Émile Côté built a new sawmill.  Today, the mill is no longer in operation. In 1973 a zoo was built, the St-Cléophas Ecological Centre, funded through donations from nine parishioners.  In 1976  the name St-Cléophas Ecological Centre became known as Naturanimo, which closed 1996.

History of the parish 
In 1918 the parish founded the first mission of St-Cléophas. On the 17th of January 1921, the first priest was appointed and so began the canonical life of the parish.

Motto 
The motto of the municipality is Freedom, Love, Work .

Important People born in Saint-Cléophas 
 Richard Joubert:  He worked thirty years at the Canadian Broadcasting Corporation, in both Quebec City and Toronto, where he was host and producer. Since 1995, he is actively involved in the making of music both song and poetry.  He also teaches lectures and courses on music and singing, and in recent years performs public poetry readings.

Tourism 
Saint-Cléophas is often visited in spring for its numerous maple groves.  Moreover, this is a place for hiking, snowmobile and ATV through its many trails. Between 1973 and 1996, St-Cléophas was a very important tourist attraction in the region with the Naturanimo Centre . The zoo housed mainly Canadian animals. Its varieties of species, its large size, its development and activities such as horse pulls, 4x4, tractors and country meals, added to the popularity of Naturanimo Centre. The municipality is part of the tourist region of Gaspésie–Îles-de-la-Madeleine in the Matapedia Valley.

Administration

Municipal Council 
The council consists of a mayor and six councilors who are elected every four year block without territorial division through rotation.

Political representations 
Provincially Saint-Cléophas is part of the provincial riding of Matapédia (electoral district). In the Quebec general election of 2008, the outgoing MP Danielle Doyer, the Parti Québécois was re-elected to represent the people of Saint-Cléophas in the National Assembly of Quebec.

Federally Saint-Cléophas is part of the federal riding of Haute-Gaspésie—La Mitis—Matane—Matapédia. In the Canadian federal election of 2008, the incumbent Jean-Yves Roy of the Bloc Québécois, was elected to represent the people of Saint-Cleophas in the House of Commons of Canada.

Demographics 

See also 
 List of parish municipalities in Quebec

Related Articles 
 Matapédia, Quebec
 Matapedia Valley
 Bas-Saint-Laurent
 Matapedia (provincial electoral district)
 Haute-Gaspésie—La Mitis—Matane—Matapédia

References 

Parish municipalities in Quebec
Incorporated places in Bas-Saint-Laurent
La Matapédia Regional County Municipality